'King' Bulelani Lobengula Khumalo is the supposed third king of the Ndebele tribe. He succeeded King Lobengula who was overthrown by colonial forces during the 1893 First Matabele War. His coronation took place in a private ceremony in Bulawayo on 28 September 2018. In 2019 he held his first Imbizo in Beria Park, Johannesburg.

History 
King Bulelani Lobengula was the first to take up rule in the Mthwakazi Kingdom since 1894. He became the third king in September 2018 after the disappearance of King Lobengula. Bayethe Ndabezitha! He currently resides in the royal palace Ntabamhlophe. Despite several attempts to temporarily put a pause on his coronation for review and process by the  Zimbabwean government, Bulelani Lobengula was crowned in a private ceremony by the Khumalo house.

King Bulelani Lobengula Attends 2023 Incwala In eSwatini 

In 2023, King Bulelani Lobengula attended the Incwala Cultural Festival In eSwatini  which is the first step in uniting the Nguni tribe.

References

Living people
1986 births